Robert Leighton Jr. (born July 7, 1965) is an American politician in the state of Minnesota. He served in the Minnesota House of Representatives.

References

Democratic Party members of the Minnesota House of Representatives
1965 births
Living people
People from Austin, Minnesota
Minnesota lawyers
University of California, Berkeley alumni
University of Minnesota alumni